Heem or variant thereof, may refer to:

People 
 Jan Heem (late 13th century - early 14th century), Flemish politician
 David Davidsz de Heem (1570–1632), Dutch painter
 Jan Davidsz. de Heem (1606–1684), Dutch painter, son of David Davidsz
 Jan Janszoon de Heem (1650–1695), Dutch painter, son of Jan Davidszoon
 Cornelis de Heem (1631–1695), Dutch painter, son of Jan Davidszoon
 David Cornelisz de Heem (1663–1701), Dutch painter, son of Cornelis
 Bryce Heem (born 1989), New Zealand rugby union footballer

Places 
 Embaba Airport (ICAO airport code: HEEM), a closed airport in Giza, Egypt
 -heem (-hiem), the Frisian place-suffix, see Artificial dwelling hill

Other 
 Higher Education European Masters (HEEM), an Erasmus Mundus program

See also
Heme or Haem, the blood cofactor
 Himanshu Kumar Suri or Heems (born 1985), American rapper